Seefeel is the self-titled fourth studio album by the British band Seefeel, released 31 January 2011 on Warp. The album received generally favourable reviews.

Background
The album is Seefeel's first full-length release in 14 years. Along with original members Mark Clifford and Sarah Peacock, the album features the rhythm section of former Boredoms drummer Iida Kazuhisa (aka E~Da) and Shigeru Ishihara (aka DJ Scotch Egg).

Release
Seefeel was released in the United Kingdom on 31 January 2011. It was released on vinyl record, compact disc and digital download.

Critical reception

At Metacritic, which assigns a normalised rating out of 100 to reviews from mainstream critics, the album received an average score of 72 based on 14 reviews, indicating "generally favorable reviews".

Tom Hughes of The Guardian called it "A hugely impressive rebirth" and noted that "it's largely downtempo – live drums and bass provide a roomy, dub-tinged framework for all the emergent noise – but treads a fine line between tension and chaos."

Track listing

Credits
Credits adapted from Seefeel compact disc booklet
 Seefeel – creator, performer
 Mark Clifford – producer
 Zavoloka – design 
 Noel Summerville – mastering
 Fenk – photography

See also
 2011 in music

References

Seefeel albums
2011 albums
Warp (record label) albums